Psychropotes semperiana is a species of sea cucumber in the family Psychropotidae.

References

Psychropotidae
Animals described in 1882
Taxa named by Johan Hjalmar Théel